Karikkode is a village in Idukki district in the Indian state of Kerala. Karikkode is near by Thodupuzha town. Film actor Asif Ali's native place is Karikkode.

Demographics
 India census, Karikkode had a population of 11960 with 5979 males and 5981 females.

References

Villages in Idukki district